Tracy Daszkiewicz (born 17 November 1973)
is a Deputy Director of Population Health and Wellbeing at Public Health England. She was formerly the Director of Public Health and Safety for the county of Wiltshire, England, where in 2018 she played a leading role in the response to the Novichok poisoning of Sergei and Yulia Skripal in Salisbury.

Career 

She began her career as a health clinic receptionist in Coventry, then undertook a degree in social work with the Open University.

Novichok poisonings 

Although she had worked for Wiltshire Council for ten years, she had only been in post as Director of Public Health for three months at the time of the Skripal poisonings in March 2018 (she had previously served in the post in an interim role). Her work on the incident, and the subsequent poisonings of Charlie Rowley and Dawn Sturgess (the latter fatal), resulted in her being profiled by The Guardian in January 2019.

She was portrayed by Anne-Marie Duff (and was briefly seen, as herself, in a non speaking role) in the three-part BBC Television drama The Salisbury Poisonings, screened in June 2020, in preparation for which she was "interviewed extensively" by the programme makers. Lawrence Bowen, the series' executive producer, said:

Daszkiewicz was reported as saying that her character in the series is a composite of many different people who dealt with the aftermath. The series resulted in her receiving renewed media attention, including an interview in The Telegraph, which described her as:

Later work 

She also played a leading role in Wiltshire Council's response to the 2020 COVID-19 pandemic.

In June 2020, she joined Public Health England as Deputy Director of Population Health and Wellbeing for South-West England.

Awards 
Daszkiewicz received an honorary degree from the University of the West of England in 2022.

Personal life 

Daszkiewicz is married to Ted (played by William Houston in The Salisbury Poisonings), with three daughters and a son. As of 2020, the couple live near Salisbury.

References

External links 
 
 Video of Daszkiewicz presenting a public health report in 2019
 BBC Promo film for The Salisbury Poisonings, with Daszkiewicz interview
 Interviewed by Jenny Hair for 'Her Salisbury Story'

Living people
1973 births
Place of birth missing (living people)
Public Health England
English social workers
Alumni of the Open University
English women
People from Wiltshire